James Madison Barker (October 23, 1839 – October 2, 1905) was a justice of the Massachusetts Supreme Judicial Court from 1891 to 1905. He was appointed by Governor William E. Russell.

Baker was born in Pittsfield, Massachusetts to John Vanderburgh, a woolen manufacturer whose American ancestry could be traced back to settlers of Rhode Island in 1663, and Sarah (Apthorp) Barker. The National Cyclopaedia of American Biography says of Barker:

Barker died in Boston, Massachusetts, while sitting as a single justice.

References

1839 births
1905 deaths
Justices of the Massachusetts Supreme Judicial Court
Williams College alumni
Harvard Law School alumni
Yale Law School alumni
Members of the Massachusetts House of Representatives
People from Pittsfield, Massachusetts
19th-century American politicians
19th-century American judges
Civil service reform in the United States